Walla Walla Valley Academy (WWVA) is a Seventh-day Adventist grades 9–12 school located in College Place, Washington.  College Place is next to the larger town of Walla Walla and is in the Walla Walla Valley.
The academy is a part of the Seventh-day Adventist education system, the world's second largest Christian school system.

History 
The school opened in 1886 as the Milton Academy. Originally the school was located in Milton-Freewater, Oregon, where the City Hall building is situated today. It was the first Seventh-day Adventist academy in the Pacific Northwest. Its sister school is Upper Columbia Academy.

In 1892, Milton Academy joined Walla Walla College (now Walla Walla University) and was renamed Walla Walla College Academy.  It academically separated from the college in 1935, and was accredited by the State in 1937.  When a new elementary school, Clara E. Rogers Elementary School, was built in 1953, the academy moved to the old elementary school building.  In 1964, another move brought the school to its current location and the academy became known as Walla Walla Valley Academy (WWVA).

WWVA has several music groups including the concert band, Praise Ringers (bell choir), string orchestra, choir, and WWVA Singers, who present programs for various church, civic, and school activities.

Academics
The required curriculum includes classes in the following subject areas: Religion, English, Oral Communications, Social Studies, Mathematics, Science, Physical Education, Health, Computer Applications, Fine Arts, Personal Finance, and Electives.

Spiritual aspects
All students take religion classes each year that they are enrolled. These classes cover topics in biblical history and Christian and denominational doctrines. Instructors in other disciplines also begin each class period with prayer or a short devotional thought, many which encourage student input. Weekly, the entire student body gathers together in the auditorium for an hour-long chapel service.
Outside the classrooms there is year-round spiritually oriented programming that relies on student involvement.

Athletics
WWVA is currently in the Eastern Washington Athletic Conference. Other teams include DeSales, Dayton-Waitsburg, Liberty Christian, Columbia, Tri-Cities Prep, White Swan, Lyle/Wishram, and Mabton. In the fall WWVA competes in co-ed soccer, cross country running, and women's volleyball. The varsity soccer and volleyball teams compete in the annual Fall Classics, an Adventist high school tournament, hosted by the neighboring Walla Walla University. In the winter students may compete in men's and women's basketball. At the end of the season, they compete in a similar tournament hosted by Walla Walla University called the Friendship Tournament. In the spring, WWVA offers track and field, co-ed baseball, and co-ed golf.

WWVA also offers a program called AcroKinghts, an acrobatics team. While not technically a sport, with the team performing at various venues instead of competing against other acrobatic teams.  It is offered year-round and students are awarded with credits. The team does a bi-annual mission trip to various countries with past trips including Belize and Jamaica. The team's largest performance to date was at the March 12, 2013 Portland Trail Blazers game against the Memphis Grizzlies.

Covid-19 Pandemic 
In March 2020, the school began online only schooling, due to the COVID-19 Pandemic. Classes were taught via Zoom, and assignments were completed through Google Classroom. During the 2020 school year, which began August 2020, students were required to wear a face covering at all times in the building, and perform an online COVID-19 screening at the start of each day. For the first few weeks, classes were conducted outdoors, then returned inside when the weather started to get cold.

See also

 List of Seventh-day Adventist secondary schools
 Seventh-day Adventist education

References

External links 
 

High schools in Walla Walla County, Washington
Adventist secondary schools in the United States
Education in Walla Walla, Washington
Private high schools in Washington (state)